Lucius Valerius Messalla (fl. 3rd century) was a Roman senator.

Life
Messalla, a member of the third century gens Valeria, was possibly the son of Lucius Valerius Messalla Thrasea Priscus and speculatively his wife Coelia Balbina, since the cognomen Balbinus appears in their great-grandson's name. He apparently did not suffer any repercussions following the purge that saw his father put to death on the orders of the emperor Caracalla in 212, and in fact he was appointed consul prior in 214, alongside Gaius Octavius Appius Suetrius Sabinus.

It is believed this Messalla was the Valerius Messalla who was the proconsul of Asia sometime between 236 and 238. If so, there must have been some political circumstance that resulted in such a lengthy gap between his consulship and the proconsular governorship.

Christian Settipani has speculated, due to the combination of both's nomina and cognomina, that Messalla married Claudia Acilia Priscilliana, daughter of Tiberius Claudius Cleobulus and wife and first cousin Acilia Frestana, and that they may have been the parents of Lucius Valerius Claudius Acilius Priscillianus Maximus, who was twice consul.

Ancestry

Notes

References

Sources
 Mennen, Inge, Power and Status in the Roman Empire, AD 193-284 (2011)

Messalla
Imperial Roman consuls
Lucius
Year of birth unknown
Year of death unknown